Gonçalo Ribeiro may refer to:

Gonçalo Ribeiro Telles (1922-2020), Portuguese politician and architect
Gonçalo Ribeiro (handballer) (born 1997), Portuguese handball player
Gonçalo Ribeiro (footballer) (born 2006), Portuguese footballer